Juncus xiphioides is a species of rush known by the common name irisleaf rush.

It is native to the Southwestern United States, many areas of California, and in Baja California. It grows in wet areas in many habitat types.

Description
Juncus xiphioides is a rhizomatous perennial herb producing erect stems to a maximum height between about 40 and 80 centimeters. It has wide leaf blades for a rush, often exceeding one centimeter in width at the base. The few straw-colored leaves reach up to 40 centimeters in length.

The large inflorescence has many clusters of up to 70 flowers each. The flower has very narrow green, red, or yellow-brown, lance-shaped tepals and six stamens with very small anthers. The fruit is a brown oblong capsule.

Cultivation
Juncus xiphioides is cultivated as an ornamental plant, for use in native plant and water gardens, and natural landscaping projects.

References

External links

Jepson Manual Treatment
Photo gallery

xiphioides
Flora of Arizona
Flora of California
Flora of Baja California
Flora of Nevada
Flora of New Mexico
Flora of the Klamath Mountains
Flora of the Sierra Nevada (United States)
Natural history of the California chaparral and woodlands
Natural history of the California Coast Ranges
Natural history of the Central Valley (California)
Natural history of the Channel Islands of California
Natural history of the Peninsular Ranges
Natural history of the San Francisco Bay Area
Natural history of the Santa Monica Mountains
Natural history of the Transverse Ranges
Plants described in 1822
Garden plants of North America
Flora without expected TNC conservation status